Klub Sportowy Wda Świecie is a football club from Świecie, Poland. It was found in 1957. They are currently playing in Polish Third League (IV level).

Wda has participated in three editions of the Polish Cup, but has never advanced beyond the first round.

References

External links

 Official website
 Wda Świecie at the 90minut.pl  website (Polish)

Association football clubs established in 1957
1957 establishments in Poland
Świecie County
Football clubs in Kuyavian-Pomeranian Voivodeship